Néider Yesid Morantes Londoño (born August 3, 1975), known as Neider Morantes, is a Colombian retired footballer.

Club career 
He made his professional debut with Atlético Nacional in 1994. For the 2000–01 season, he transferred to Atlante of the Liga MX, where he scored 2 goals in 25 appearances. He transferred in summer 2001 to Irapuato for one season. In 2002 he had a brief spell at Once Caldas, before returning to Atletico Nacional for the 2002–03 season.

After that He played the 2003 Clausura with Atlético Bucaramanga. The following year he transferred to Nacional's rivals, Independiente Medellín. For the 2005 Apertura, he played with Leones.

Titles

Atlético Nacional 

 1999 Categoría Primera A

Independiente Medellin 

 2004 Categoría Primera A Apertura

Notes

External links
 

1975 births
Living people
Colombian footballers
Footballers from Medellín
Colombian expatriate footballers
Colombia international footballers
1997 Copa América players
1999 Copa América players
2004 Copa América players
Categoría Primera A players
Liga MX players
Atlético Bucaramanga footballers
Atlético Nacional footballers
Independiente Medellín footballers
Barcelona S.C. footballers
Once Caldas footballers
Irapuato F.C. footballers
Atlante F.C. footballers
Envigado F.C. players
Boyacá Chicó F.C. footballers
Leones F.C. footballers
Expatriate footballers in Mexico
Expatriate footballers in Ecuador
Association football midfielders